This list of museums in Nottinghamshire, England contains museums which are defined for this context as institutions (including nonprofit organizations, government entities, and private businesses) that collect and care for objects of cultural, artistic, scientific, or historical interest and make their collections or related exhibits available for public viewing. Also included are non-profit art galleries and university art galleries.  Museums that exist only in cyberspace (i.e., virtual museums) are not included.

Defunct museums
 Lace Centre, Nottingham, closed in 2009 
 Longdale Craft Centre, Ravenshead
 Millgate Museum of Folk Life, Newark-on-Trent 
 Newark Millgate Museum, closed in 2012
 Vina's Doll Gallery,  Cromwell, closed in 2015

See also
 :Category:Tourist attractions in Nottinghamshire

References

Visit Nottinghamshire Museums

 
Nottinghamshire
Museums